Dark flight can refer to

 Dark Flight, a 2012 Thai horror film
 Dark flight (astronomy), a phase in the descent of some larger meteors where the meteorite falls at terminal velocity
 Drawn: Dark Flight, the second installment in the Drawn series of games
 Dark Flight, the dam of The Night Patrol, the 1924 winner of the W. S. Cox Plate thoroughbred horse race